Kids Newspaper is a non-profit, free monthly newspaper published in Spokane, Washington.  Circulated through elementary schools at the beginning of each school month, Kids Newspaper focuses on supporting the parent-child relationship in an effort to build a stronger community.  Articles about wellness, family activities, excellence in education, monthly features and contests encourage children and parents to connect each month with Kids Newspaper.  

Founded in 1993 by Mary Helen Black and Rita Wessels, Kids Newspaper has established a monthly circulation of 30,000 newspapers (10 publications per year).

Newspapers published in Washington (state)